Dragan Isailović (born 12 January 1976) is a Serbian former professional footballer who played as a striker. He is best remembered for his performances in his one season with Partizan, securing him a transfer to La Liga side Valladolid in 1998. However, Isailović failed to make an impact in Spain, before going on to play for numerous clubs in Portugal, Cyprus, and Bulgaria.

Club career
After spending two seasons at Zemun, Isailović moved to Partizan in the summer of 1997. He soon became a fan favorite after scoring the winning goal in a 1–0 home win over Croatia Zagreb in the first leg of the UEFA Champions League first qualifying round. However, they were eliminated after a 5–0 loss in the return leg. Isailović finished the 1997–98 season as the team's top scorer across all competitions, helping them win the national cup.

Between 1998 and 2001, Isailović was under contract with Spanish club Valladolid, but made just 13 appearances in La Liga over the course of three seasons. He subsequently moved to Segunda División side Burgos, helping them avoid relegation in his debut season. However, the club was expelled from the league due to administrative problems.

International career
Isailović represented FR Yugoslavia at under-21 level, scoring four goals in five appearances during the team's unsuccessful qualification campaign for the 1998 UEFA Under-21 Championship.

Personal life
His son, Aleksandar, is also a footballer.

Career statistics

Honours
Partizan
 FR Yugoslavia Cup: 1997–98
AEK Larnaca
 Cypriot Cup: 2003–04

References

External links
 
 

1976 births
Living people
Footballers from Belgrade
Serbia and Montenegro footballers
Serbian footballers
Association football forwards
Serbia and Montenegro under-21 international footballers
FK Radnički Obrenovac players
FK Čukarički players
FK Zemun players
FK Partizan players
Real Valladolid players
Burgos CF footballers
F.C. Marco players
AEK Larnaca FC players
PFC Litex Lovech players
Ethnikos Achna FC players
CD Alcoyano footballers
Digenis Akritas Morphou FC players
Alki Larnaca FC players
Ermis Aradippou FC players
First League of Serbia and Montenegro players
La Liga players
Segunda División players
Segunda División B players
Liga Portugal 2 players
Cypriot First Division players
Serbia and Montenegro expatriate footballers
Expatriate footballers in Spain
Expatriate footballers in Portugal
Expatriate footballers in Cyprus
Expatriate footballers in Bulgaria
Serbia and Montenegro expatriate sportspeople in Spain
Serbia and Montenegro expatriate sportspeople in Cyprus
Serbia and Montenegro expatriate sportspeople in Bulgaria